The Kitchen Library was the first non-profit lending library of kitchen appliances in Canada. Since opening its doors inside the Toronto Tool Library in October 2013, The Kitchen Library received local, national, and international media attention and community support. The Kitchen Library moved to Yonge and Eglinton (inside Living City Health) in October 2014 where they lent appliances and taught workshops. It closed September 1, 2016.

As population increases and the average size of condos decrease, they believed that space and income shouldn't be barriers to cooking and healthy eating. By providing access to otherwise costly and space-consuming appliances they built a more shareable city for the future.

In 2014 they were named by Canadian Living as one of the "7 Canadian inventions that make your life better," and were featured in Toronto Life, The Toronto Star, The National Post, and CBC News.

See also
List of tool-lending libraries
Sharing economy

References

External links
 The Kitchen Library - official site
 The Toronto Tool Library

Libraries in Toronto
2013 establishments in Ontario
Kitchenware
Tool libraries
2016 disestablishments in Ontario
Libraries established in 2013